La Cambre (in Dutch: Ter Kameren or Terkameren) may refer to one of several locations in and around the municipality of Ixelles in Brussels, Belgium:

La Cambre, a visual arts and architecture school.
Abbey of La Cambre, a former abbey.
Bois de la Cambre, a public park.
Résidence de la Cambre, a historic skyscraper.

In addition, Cambre may refer to a Spanish town, in the province of A Coruña, Galicia.